During the 1963–64 season Hibernian, a football club based in Edinburgh, came tenth out of 18 clubs in the Scottish First Division.

Scottish First Division

Final League table

Scottish League Cup

Group stage

Group 2 final table

Knockout stage

Scottish Cup

1964 Summer Cup

Group 4 Final Table

Knockout stage

After Hearts pulled out due to tour of USA, second-place Hibernian and third-place Dunfermline played each other for a place in the semi-final.

Continued into August

See also
List of Hibernian F.C. seasons

References

External links
Hibernian 1963/1964 results and fixtures, Soccerbase

Hibernian F.C. seasons
Hibernian